Women in Trouble is a 2009 American comedy film written and directed by Sebastián Gutiérrez and starring Carla Gugino, Adrianne Palicki, Marley Shelton, Cameron Richardson, Connie Britton and Emmanuelle Chriqui.
It was shot in 10 days for $50,000.

Plot
The film focuses on six women in Los Angeles as their lives become intertwined in the course of 24 hours.

After learning that she is pregnant, porn star Elektra Luxx gets stuck in an elevator with Doris, sister to Addy. Addy has recently started taking her daughter (who is actually the biological daughter of Doris but due to drug abuse and Doris’ at the time abusive boyfriend, she was raised by Addy) Charlotte, to see her therapist, Maxine, while secretly using the visits to sleep with Maxine's husband. Upon learning about the affair during a therapy session with Charlotte, Maxine rushes out and gets into her car. While backing out, she hits porn star Holly Rocket, a colleague of Elektra Luxx who had been fleeing with her friend, Bambi, from a job that had gone wrong. Meanwhile, flight attendant Cora finds herself the object of rock star, Nick Chapel's (Josh Brolin), affection on a flight to his band's upcoming show.

Cast
Carla Gugino as Elektra Luxx, adult film superstar
Adrianne Palicki as Holly Rocket, adult film actress
Connie Britton as Doris, Addy's sister
Caitlin Keats as Addy Hunter, Doris' sister
Isabella Gutierrez as Charlotte, 13-year-old girl, daughter of Doris
Marley Shelton as Cora, flight attendant
Garcelle Beauvais-Nilon as Maggie, flight attendant
Josh Brolin as Nick Chapel, rock star (drummer and songwriter) who's a passenger on the airplane
Emmanuelle Chriqui as Bambi, call girl
Rya Kihlstedt as Rita, barmaid at Ruby's Caribbean, the lesbian bar, & Darby's roommate
Cameron Richardson as Darby, masseuse and Rita's roommate
Sarah Clarke as Maxine McPherson, therapist
Simon Baker as Travis McPherson, the therapist's husband
Xander Berkeley as Mr. Frost, one of the people talking to the therapist
Elizabeth Berkley as Tracy, one of the people talking to the therapist
Lauren Katz as Tara, one of the people talking to the therapist
Paul Cassell as a Jay, one of the people talking to the therapist
Ermahn Ospina as El Capitan, character in the porn movie
Greg Lauren as fireman
Samantha Shelton as singer at Ruby's Caribbean (bar)
Antonio Graña as Jimbo, the mafioso muscle
Joseph Gordon-Levitt as Bert Rodriguez, "sex blogger"

Production and sequel

The film was directed by Sebastian Gutierrez. Production began and ended in Los Angeles. The film premiered at the 2009 South by Southwest Film Festival. The film opened in the United States on November 13, 2009. A sequel, Elektra Luxx, was released on March 11, 2011. Gutierrez returns as the writer-director, and the cast includes Carla Gugino, Joseph Gordon-Levitt, Timothy Olyphant, Julianne Moore  and Justin Kirk. Gutierrez is planning on making a third installment, tentatively titled Women in Ecstasy which was initially planned to be released in 2012.

Critical reception
Women in Trouble polarized critics. On the positive side, Joe Leydon of Variety gave it a rave review, calling it "A compulsively watchable mix of high camp and grand passions, soap opera and softcore sex. Very much in the deliriously lewd style of Pedro Almodóvar—who has co-written unproduced scripts with Gutierrez, and gets a shout-out in the closing credits—this exuberantly uninhibited indie has the anything-goes spirit of something tossed off in a single burst of collaborative energy". Kevin Thomas of the Los Angeles Times assessed: "Women in Trouble has sleeper written all over it and a sequel is already in the works". Kyle Smith of the New York Post said "Unlikely accidents, shared secrets and zany twists combine to whip up a pleasing froth". John DeFore writing for The Hollywood Reporter praised the direction: "Gutierrez's script can not supply female characters as believable as Almodovar's, but in the director's chair he gives his cast room to compensate with funny, self-aware performances".

At the other end of the spectrum, Melissa Anderson writing for The Village Voice said "blue material mixes awkwardly with sob stories". Manohla Dargis of The New York Times was not amused, complaining that "The amateurish production values might be pardoned if the clichés—the hard-core porn star with the soft heart, the therapist who needs to heal herself—inside the poorly lighted, badly shot images were not so absurd and often insulting". Matthew Connolly of Slant Magazine gave it 1.5 out of 4 stars and said "At a particularly rundown corner of Almodóvar Boulevard and Tarantino Lane, you’ll find Women in Trouble".

References

External links

Elektra Luxx's blog entry about Women in Trouble, from a promotional blog for Women in Trouble and related films

2000s sex comedy films
American comedy films
American sex comedy films
American independent films
Films directed by Sebastian Gutierrez
Films about pornography
2009 comedy films
2009 films
2000s English-language films
2000s American films